The American Mosquito Control Association (AMCA) is an American nonprofit organization and the world's leading organization dedicated to mosquito control. It was established in Trenton, New Jersey, in 1935 as the Eastern Association of Mosquito Control Workers, obtaining its current name in 1944. Currently, it is based in Mount Laurel, New Jersey. It publishes the Journal of the American Mosquito Control Association.

References

External links

Journal website

1935 establishments in New Jersey
Public health organizations
Non-profit organizations based in New Jersey
Organizations established in 1935
Pest control organizations